The 1998 Dutch Open was an ATP men's tennis tournament held in Amsterdam, Netherlands. It was the 39th edition of the tournament and was held from 3 August until 9 August 1998. Unseeded Magnus Norman won his first title of the year, and the second of his career.

Finals

Singles

 Magnus Norman defeated  Richard Fromberg, 6–3, 6–3, 2–6, 6–4.

Doubles

 Jacco Eltingh /  Paul Haarhuis defeated  Dominik Hrbatý /  Karol Kučera, 6–3, 6–2.

References

 
Dutch Open (tennis)
1998 in Dutch tennis
Dutch Open (tennis), 1998